The 2019 Russian Open was a badminton tournament which took place at Sport Hall Olympic in Vladivostok, Russia, from 16 to 21 July 2019 and had a total purse of $75,000.

Tournament
The 2019 Russian Open was the fourth Super 100 tournament of the 2019 BWF World Tour and also part of the Russian Open championships, which had been held since 1992. This tournament was organized by the National Badminton Federation of Russia and sanctioned by the BWF.

Venue
This international tournament was held at Sport Hall Olympic in Vladivostok, Primorsky Krai, Far Eastern Federal District, Russia.

Point distribution
Below is the point distribution table for each phase of the tournament based on the BWF points system for the BWF Tour Super 100 event.

Prize money
The total prize money for this tournament was US$75,000. Distribution of prize money was in accordance with BWF regulations.

Men's singles

Seeds

 Subhankar Dey (third round)
 Shesar Hiren Rhustavito (champion)
 Loh Kean Yew (final)
 Ihsan Maulana Mustofa (semi-finals)
 Chico Aura Dwi Wardoyo (quarter-finals)
 Pablo Abián (quarter-finals)
 Soo Teck Zhi (second round)
 Sergey Sirant (second round)

Finals

Top half

Section 1

Section 2

Bottom half

Section 3

Section 4

Women's singles

Seeds

 Kirsty Gilmour (final)
 Yvonne Li (first round)
 Nguyễn Thùy Linh (second round)
 Beatriz Corrales (withdrew)
 Ksenia Polikarpova (second round)
 Lianne Tan (withdrew)
 Pai Yu-po (champion)
 Brittney Tam (withdrew)

Finals

Top half

Section 1

Section 2

Bottom half

Section 3

Section 4

Men's doubles

Seeds

 Vladimir Ivanov / Ivan Sozonov (semi-finals)
 Phillip Chew / Ryan Chew (second round)
 Arun George /  Sanyam Shukla (second round)
 Keiichiro Matsui / Yoshinori Takeuchi (final)
 Dhruv Kapila / Krishna Prasad Garaga (second round)
 Denis Grachev / Pavel Kotsarenko (quarter-finals)
 Muhammad Shohibul Fikri /  Bagas Maulana (second round)
 Jones Ralfy Jansen / Peter Käsbauer (quarter-finals)

Finals

Top half

Section 1

Section 2

Bottom half

Section 3

Section 4

Women's doubles

Seeds

 Meghana Jakkampudi / Poorvisha S. Ram (semi-finals)
 Pooja Dandu / Sanjana Santosh (withdrew)
 Olga Morozova / Anastasiia Akchurina (second round)
 Miyuki Kato / Miki Kashihara (final)
 Ni Ketut Mahadewi Istirani / Tania Oktaviani Kusumah (champions)
 Siti Fadia Silva Ramadhanti / Ribka Sugiarto (quarter-finals)
 Erina Honda / Nozomi Shimizu (semi-finals)
 Viktoriia Kozyreva / Mariia Sukhova (quarter-finals)

Finals

Top half

Section 1

Section 2

Bottom half

Section 3

Section 4

Mixed doubles

Seeds

 Evgenij Dremin / Evgenia Dimova (final)
 Rohan Kapoor / Kuhoo Garg (second round)
 Danny Bawa Chrisnanta / Tan Wei Han (semi-finals)
 Jakub Bitman / Alžběta Bášová (quarter-finals)
 Rehan Naufal Kusharjanto / Lisa Ayu Kusumawati (quarter-finals)
 Krishna Prasad Garaga / Poorvisha S. Ram (quarter-finals)
 Adnan Maulana / Mychelle Crhystine Bandaso (champions)
 Dhruv Kapila / Meghana Jakkampudi (semi-finals)

Finals

Top half

Section 1

Section 2

Bottom half

Section 3

Section 4

References

External links
 Tournament Link

Russian Open (badminton)
Russian Open
Russian Open (badminton)
Sport in Vladivostok
Russian Open (badminton)